Hemanta Kalita is a Bharatiya Janata Party politician from Assam. He was elected in Assam Legislative Assembly election in 1996 from Titabar constituency. Formerly, he was with Asom Gana Parishad.

References 

Living people
Asom Gana Parishad politicians
Bharatiya Janata Party politicians from Assam
Assam MLAs 1996–2001
People from Jorhat district
Year of birth missing (living people)